Downhill from Here is a concert performance video by the Grateful Dead.  It was recorded at Alpine Valley Music Theatre, near East Troy, Wisconsin, in July, 1989.  Produced by Len Dell'Amico and Grateful Dead Productions. It was released by Monterey Home Video, on VHS in 1997 and on DVD in 1999, with a running time of 2 hours 30 minutes, and by Pioneer Entertainment, on LaserDisc in 1997.

Most of Downhill From Here was recorded on July 17, 1989. However, the last four songs of the first set – "Row Jimmy", "When I Paint My Masterpiece", "When Push Comes to Shove", and "The Music Never Stopped" – have been replaced with the last three songs of the first set from July 19 – "West L.A. Fadeaway", "Desolation Row", and "Deal".

"The Music Never Stopped" from July 17 is included in the albums Weir Here and Fallout from the Phil Zone. The latter also includes "Box of Rain" from July 19, and "Foolish Heart" from that date is a bonus track on Built to Last.

The title of the video is a play on words referring to the steep slope of Alpine Valley's general admission section, and perhaps also to the notion that 1989 through 1990 was the band's final peak period.

Track listing

First set
 "Let The Good Times Roll" (Cooke) →
 "Feel Like A Stranger" (Weir, Barlow)
 "Built To Last" (Garcia, Hunter)
 "Me and My Uncle" (Phillips) →
 "Cumberland Blues" (Garcia, Lesh, Hunter)
 "It's All Over Now" (B. Womack, S. Womack)
July 19, 1989 – first set:
 "West L.A. Fadeaway" (Garcia, Hunter)
 "Desolation Row" (Dylan) →
 "Deal" (Garcia, Hunter)
Second set
 "China Cat Sunflower" (Garcia, Hunter) →
 "I Know You Rider" (traditional, arranged by Grateful Dead)
 "Playing in the Band" (Weir, Hart, Hunter) →
 "Uncle John's Band" (Garcia, Hunter) →
 "Standing On The Moon" (Garcia, Hunter) →
 "Drums" (Kreutzmann, Hart) →
 "Space" (Garcia, Weir, Lesh, Mydland) →
 "The Wheel" (Garcia, Kreutzmann, Hunter) →
 "Gimme Some Lovin'" (S. Winwood, M. Winwood, Davis) →
 "Goin' Down The Road Feelin' Bad" (traditional, arranged by Grateful Dead) →
 "Not Fade Away" (Hardin, Petty)
 "We Bid You Goodnight" (traditional, arranged by Grateful Dead)
Encore
 "Johnny B. Goode" (Berry)

Credits
Grateful Dead
 Jerry Garcia – guitar
 Mickey Hart – drums, percussion
 Bill Kreutzmann – drums, percussion
 Phil Lesh – bass
 Brent Mydland – keyboards
 Bob Weir – guitar
Production
 Len Dell'Amico – director, producer
 John Cutler and Phil Lesh – sound production, mixing
 Candace Brightman – lighting director
 Dan Healy – concert sound
 Bob Bralove – sound design and programming
 Allen Newman – line producer
 Bill Weber – video post editing
 Jeffrey Norman – audio post editing
 Terry Donahue – technical direction
 Billy Steinberg – senior video

References

Grateful Dead video albums
1997 films
American documentary films
Concert films
1990s English-language films
1990s American films